Bernardino Bilbao Beyner (1788–1844) was a Chilean lawyer and politician. He was born in Santiago in 1788. He died in Valparaíso on September 13, 1844. He was the son of Francisco Bilbao and Doña Josefa Gonzalez Beyner Perez.

Education
He studied at el Seminario (1800) and graduated as a lawyer with the Royal Court, on December 10, 1810. He was ordained priest in 1813 and was curate of San Isidro. In 1814 he was an ecclesiastical prosecuting attorney.

Political career
He was elected Member of Parliament for Talca in 1823 and 1824, for Santiago in 1825 and reelected in 1827. During these four terms he joined the Police Commission and the Institutes of Public Charity and Mercy. He was president of the House of Representatives (1825-1826).

He was again elected Member of Parliament for the Liberal Party, representing Petorca, in 1837, joining, this time, the Standing Committee on Law and Justice and the Ecclesiastical Commission.
In 1841 he was canon of Mercy for the Cathedral of Santiago.

References 

1788 births
1844 deaths
Members of the Chamber of Deputies of Chile
People from Santiago
19th-century Chilean lawyers